
Gmina Stryków is an urban-rural gmina (administrative district) in Zgierz County, Łódź Voivodeship, in central Poland.

The gmina contains part of the protected area called Łódź Hills Landscape Park.

Villages
Apart from the town of Stryków, Gmina Stryków contains the villages and settlements of Anielin, Anielin Swędowski, Bartolin, Bratoszewice, Bronin, Cesarka, Ciołek, Dobieszków, Dobra, Dobra-Nowiny, Gozdów, Kalinów, Kiełmina, Klęk, Koźle, Krucice, Lipa, Lipka, Ługi, Michałówek, Niesułków, Niesułków-Kolonia, Nowostawy Górne, Orzechówek, Osse, Pludwiny, Rokitnica, Sadówka, Sierżnia, Smolice, Sosnowiec, Sosnowiec-Pieńki, Stary Imielnik, Swędów, Tymianka, Warszewice, Wola Błędowa, Wrzask, Wyskoki, Zagłoba and Zelgoszcz.

Neighbouring gminas
Gmina Stryków is bordered by the towns of Głowno and Łódź, and by the gminas of Brzeziny, Dmosin, Głowno, Nowosolna and Zgierz.

References
Polish official population figures 2006

Strykow
Zgierz County